Anna Elise Hall (born July 8, 1999) is an American professional volleyball player who plays as a middle blocker for the United States women's national volleyball team and Italian Series A1 professional team Cuneo Granda Volley.

Early life

Hall grew up in Laurens, South Carolina and attended Laurens High School, where she played volleyball. She was the 82nd nationally ranked recruit in her graduating class, and was high school All-American. With her high school club team, she was a two-time national champion.

Career

College
Hall played college volleyball for a total of five years, as she opted to use the extra year of eligibility granted by the NCAA due to the COVID-19 pandemic. After playing two seasons at Auburn, Hall transferred to Louisville, playing from 2019–2021. In her second season with Louisville in 2020, she earned AVCA Second Team All-American honors. In her final year in 2021, she was named a First Team All-American and helped Louisville finish as a semifinalist in the 2021 NCAA tournament. She was a member of the U.S. Collegiate National team as well in 2021.

Professional clubs

  Aydın Büyükşehir Belediyespor (2021–2022)
  Cuneo Granda Volley (2022–)

USA National Team 

In May 2022, Hall made her national team debut when she was named to the 25-player roster for the 2022 FIVB Volleyball Nations League tournament. 

Hall was named to the roster for the FIVB World Championship. She saw limited playing time in the tournament, but notably had 12 points in a match against Germany, with 6 kills, 3 blocks, and 3 services aces. She also recorded 2 kills in a match against Serbia.  The U.S. finished in fourth place.

Awards and honors

Clubs

 2021–2022 BVA Cup –  Gold medal, with Aydın Büyükşehir Belediyespor.
 2021–2022 CEV Challenge Cup  Bronze medal, with Aydın Büyükşehir Belediyespor.

College

AVCA First Team All-American (2021)
AVCA Second Team All-American (2020)

References

1999 births
Living people
Sportspeople from South Carolina
Middle blockers
American women's volleyball players
Louisville Cardinals women's volleyball players
American expatriate sportspeople in Turkey
American expatriate sportspeople in Italy
Expatriate volleyball players in Italy
Expatriate volleyball players in Turkey
Serie A1 (women's volleyball) players